Pallone is a surname. Notable people with the surname include:
 Dave Pallone (born 1951), American former Major League Baseball umpire 
 Frank Pallone (born 1951), American lawyer and politician
 John Pallone (born 1960), American Democratic Party politician

See also 

 Pallone (disambiguation)
 Palla (surname)